Yae, YAE or yae may refer to:

 Yae, also known as Ayahuasca, a hallucinogenic drink in South America 
 Yae (Cyrillic), a Cyrillic letter (Ԙ ԙ)
 Yae (Goemon), a video game character from Goemon
 yae, the ISO 639 code for the Yaruro language, spoken in Venezuela
 YAE, the National Rail code for Yate railway station in South Gloucestershire, UK
 Yae (八重 or やえ), the Japanese word for "doubled" or "multi-layered," often in reference to flowers
 The Young Academy of Europe, a pan-European academy of young scientists

People with the given name
, Japanese singer
, Japanese nurse
, Japanese high jumper
, Japanese female warrior

See also 
 
 

Japanese feminine given names